Vladislav Shiryayev (Russian: Владислав Ширяев; born 30 October 1973 in Miass) is a retired Russian athlete who specialised in the 400 metres hurdles. He represented his country at the 2000 Summer Olympics, as well as two World Championships. In addition, he finished eighth at the 1998 European Championships.

His personal best in the event is 49.02 seconds set in Tula in 2000.

Competition record

References

1973 births
Living people
People from Miass
Sportspeople from Chelyabinsk Oblast
Russian male hurdlers
Olympic athletes of Russia
Athletes (track and field) at the 2000 Summer Olympics
Competitors at the 1998 Goodwill Games
World Athletics Championships athletes for Russia
Russian Athletics Championships winners